The white-coated titi monkey (Plecturocebus pallescens) is a species of titi monkey, a type of New World monkey, from South America. It is found in Bolivia, Brazil, and Paraguay.

References

white-coated titi
Mammals of Brazil
Mammals of Bolivia
Mammals of Paraguay
white-coated titi
white-coated titi